The sixth American Basketball Association All-Star Game was played February 6, 1973 at Salt Palace in Salt Lake City, Utah before an audience at 12,556. Larry Brown of the Carolina Cougars coached the East, with LaDell Andersen of the Utah Stars coached the West. Warren Jabali of the Denver Rockets was named MVP.

Western Conference

Eastern Conference
 

Halftime — East, 65-52
Third Quarter — East, 92-84
Officials: Norm Drucker and Ed Middleton
Attendance: 12,556.

References

External links 
 ABA All Star Game at RemembertheABA.com

All-Star
ABA All-star game
ABA All-star game